John Lawrence Sullivan (March 21, 1890 – April 1, 1966) was a Major League Baseball player. He played two seasons with the Boston Braves from (1920–1921) and Chicago Cubs (1921).

References

External links

Boston Braves players
Chicago Cubs players
Major League Baseball first basemen
Major League Baseball outfielders
1890 births
1966 deaths
Baseball players from Pennsylvania
Sportspeople from Williamsport, Pennsylvania
Elmira Colonels players
New Orleans Pelicans (baseball) players
Columbus Senators players
Los Angeles Angels (minor league) players
Shreveport Gassers players
Quincy Red Birds players